John C. Brimblecom (born January 21, 1868) was a state legislator in Massachusetts
 He studied at the schools in Newton and worked as an editor. He held city offices and served in the state house from 1920 to 1924. He was a Republican.

He was born in Swampscott. He represented the Fourth Middlesex District. He authored Beautiful Newton.

See also
 1920 Massachusetts legislature
 1921–1922 Massachusetts legislature
 1923–1924 Massachusetts legislature

References

Republican Party members of the Massachusetts House of Representatives
People from Swampscott, Massachusetts
1868 births
20th-century deaths
Year of death missing